The 22153/22154 Chennai Egmore - Salem Junction Express is a express  train which runs from Salem to Chennai via Vridhachalam and Villupuram in Tamil Nadu State India. This train is operated by Southern Railway in India and the rakes are owned by Central Railway. The train was inaugurated on 7 August 2008. The Train runs with 8 Sleeper class, 1 AC 1st Cum Second AC, 1 Second AC and 3 Third AC Coaches. It is an overnight train and runs daily in both directions.  This train is assigned 22153 number in the Chennai - Salem direction and 22154 number in the Salem - Chennai direction. This train is also fondly called as Mango Express by locals and railfans because Salem is famous for Mangoes.

History
This train was operated as a link/slip typed express train with only one coach during meter gauge era. The single train coach was attached with Pearl City Express till Vriddhachchalam Junction and after that the lone slip coach is detached at Vriddhachalam Junction and continues its journey towards Salem Junction via Chinna Salem. Introduction of a separate Train from Madras to Salem demanded  Hon'ble MP  R. KOLANTHAIVELU on 15-03-1979.  Due to the demand, After the Broad Gauge Conversion, this train was reintroduced on 7 August 2008 with two dedicated rakes and this train also had a slip coaches in broad gauge era. After getting 2 dedicated rakes for daily operation, some of the coaches are detached from this train at salem junction and proceed its journey towards Mettur Dam Railway Station via Omalur Junction, Mettucherry Road to boost Tourism. But later that slip train was cancelled around 2018 due to several reasons. After cancellation of that slip coaches, a connection train facility at Salem Junction is provided for this Express train till Mettur Dam by utilising Erode Mettur Dam Passenger train.

The important stops are as follows:
Salem Junction
Tambaram
Chengalpattu
Villupuram
Chennai Egmore
Vriddhachchalam Junction (Rake Reversal Takes Place)

Coach composition (Downward - 22153)

The train consists of:
 1 AC First cum AC Two-tier coach (HA1)
 1 AC Two-tier coach (A1)
 3 AC Three-tier coaches (B1, B2, B3)
 8 Sleeper Coaches (S1 - S8)
 2 Unreserved General Sitting Coaches (GS)
 1 Pantry Car
 2 Sitting cum Luggage Rakes

The pantry car remains locked.

Rake Sharing

It shares its rake with the 12163/12164 Dadar Terminus Chennai Egmore Superfast Express.

Demands
There are also demands to divert and operate this train via neyveli, vadaloor, cuddalore port junction since these areas has very less train connectivity and there are no trains operated in-between chennai and neyveli areas and there are also demands to extend this train till bangalore's under construction sir m visveswaraya terminal via hosur and dharmapuri since these areas also doesn't have any train connection with its state capital chennai.

References

Rail transport in Tamil Nadu
Express trains in India
Transport in Salem, Tamil Nadu
Transport in Chennai